Ceanothus caeruleus is a species of Ceanothus shrub first described by Mariano Lagasca y Segura. Ceanothus caeruleus is part of the genus Ceanothus and the family Rhamnaceae.

References 

caeruleus